The Carolina League Most Valuable Player Award is an annual award given to the most valuable player in Minor League Baseball's Carolina League. The award was first given in 1948.

Key

List

References

External links

Carolina League
Minor league baseball trophies and awards
Minor league baseball MVP award winners
Awards established in 1948